Digitaria californica is a species of grass known by the common name Arizona cottontop. It is native to the Americas, where it can be found in the southwestern United States, Mexico, Central America, and South America.

This perennial grass forms a clump of stems reaching up to a meter in height. The branching root system can reach one meter deep. There are no rhizomes or stolons. The leaf sheaths around the stems can be very hairy to woolly. The leaves are usually short and narrow. The inflorescence is a dense, narrow panicle containing pairs of woolly-haired spikelets.

This plant grows in a number of habitat types, including desert scrub and shrublands, shrubsteppe, and savanna. In the desert it sometimes grows beneath mesquites where it thrives in the local nutrients. It tolerates varying precipitation amounts and survives easily in drought conditions, becoming dormant at times, then growing quickly when rain returns. Much of its growth occurs in the summer, after the spring and summer rain cycles.

This species is a preferred grass for livestock such as cattle. It tolerates high grazing activity, but not overgrazing.

References

External links
USDA Plants Profile for Digitaria californica (Arizona cottontop)
Calflora Database: Digitaria californica (Arizona cottontop)
Dallisgrass Vs Crabgrass - Differences
The Nature Conservancy
CalPhotos Photo Gallery

Further reading
Cox, J. R., et al. (1992). Defoliation effects on resource allocation in Arizona cottontop (Digitaria californica) and Lehmann lovegrass (Eragrostis lehmanniana). J Grassl Soc South Afr 9(2).
Smith, S. E., et a. (2006). Epidermal conductance as a component of dehydration avoidance in Digitaria californica and Eragrostis lehmanniana, two perennial desert grasses. Journal of Arid Environments 64 238–50.

californica
Bunchgrasses of North America
Bunchgrasses of South America
Grasses of Mexico
Grasses of the United States
Native grasses of California
Flora of the California desert regions
Flora of the Sonoran Deserts
Natural history of the Mojave Desert
North American desert flora
Warm-season grasses of North America